Associazione Sportiva Dilettantistica HSL Derthona, also known as Derthona, is a football club based in Tortona, Piedmont, Italy. Derthona currently plays in Serie D.

References

External links
 Official homepage

 
Football clubs in Piedmont and Aosta Valley
Tortona
Association football clubs established in 1908
Italian football First Division clubs
Serie B clubs
Serie C clubs
1908 establishments in Italy